William Loeb may refer to:
William Loeb Jr. (1866–1937), political figure
William Loeb III (1905–1981), publisher

See also
Bill Loebs, comic-book writer